Yan Kyaw Htwe (born 13 October 1995) is a Burmese professional footballer who plays as a striker for Yangon United

International

References

1993 births
Living people
Burmese footballers
Myanmar international footballers
Ayeyawady United F.C. players
Association football midfielders